The House of Commons Special Committee on Canada-China Relations (CACN) is a special committee of the House of Commons of Canada. It was established in the 43rd Canadian Parliament in 2019.

Mandate
"conduct hearings to examine and review all aspects of the Canada–China relationship, including, but not limited to, consular, economic, legal, security and diplomatic relations."

Membership

Subcommittees
Subcommittee on Agenda and Procedure (SCAC)

References

Special Committee on Canada-China Relations (CACN)

Canada-China Relations